Birchfield is an unincorporated community in Yakima County, Washington, United States, located between Terrace Heights and Moxee.

The community was founded in 1910 by the North Yakima and Valley Railway Company, and was named after a local landowner, W. A. Burchfield. The name later became Birchfield as a result a misspelling resulting from poor penmanship.

References

Unincorporated communities in Yakima County, Washington
Unincorporated communities in Washington (state)